This is a list of mountains in the U.S. state of Virginia.

By mountain range
This list is arranged by mountain ranges.

Ridge-and-Valley Appalachians
Allegheny Mountain
Bear Garden Mountain
Big Schloss Mountain
Clinch Mountain
Church Mountain
Fort Lewis Mountain
Great North Mountain
Hankey Mountain
Narrow Back Mountain
Little North Mountain
Little Schloss Mountain
Little Sluice Mountain
North Mountain
Paddy Mountain
Salt Pond Mountain
Shenandoah Mountain
Elliott Knob
Reddish Knob
Tea Mountain
Threemile Mountain
Timber Ridge

Cumberland Mountains
High Knob
Pine Mountain
Powell Mountain

Blue Ridge Mountains
This list of peaks of the Blue Ridge in Virginia is listed starting from north to south.

Blue Mountain
Loudoun Heights
Purcell Knob
Mount Weather
Paris Mountain
Brushy Mountain
Lost Mountain
Naked Mountain – Elevation  
High Knob
Little Cobbler Mountain (North Cobbler Mountain) – Elevation  
Big Cobbler Mountain (South Cobbler Mountain) – Elevation  
Rattlesnake Mountain – Elevation  
Dickey Hill
Carson's Mountain
Compton's Peak
Lick Mountain
Buck Mountain
North Marshall Mountain
South Marshall Mountain
The Peak
Hogback Mountain
Sugarloaf Mountain
Jenkins Mountain
Battle Mountain
Knob Mountain
Pignut Mountain
Pass Mountain
Neighbor Mountain
Mary's Rock
Stoney Man
Old Rag Mountain
Hawksbill Mountain
Hazeltop
Lewis Mountain
Maintop Mountain
The Priest
Apple Orchard Mountain
Rocky Mountain
Peaks of Otter
Thaxton Mountain
Mill Mountain
Twelve O'clock Knob    
Roanoke Mountain
Poor Mountain
 trent or trout mountain TBD  
Whitetop Mountain
Mount Rogers
Holston Mountain
Turkeycock Mountain

Short Hill Mountain
Signal Mountain

Ragged Mountains
Fan Mountain
Mount Jefferson
Walton's Mountain

Southwest Mountains
Brush Mountain
Cameron Mountain
Carter's Mountain
Chicken Mountain
Clark's Mountain
Cowherd Mountain
Dowell Mountain
Gibson Mountain
Goodloe Mountain
Greene Mountain
Hightop Mountain
Jerdone Mountain
Lonesome Mountain
Merry Mountain
Peters Mountain
Roundtop Mountain
Scott Mountain
Sugarloaf Mountain
Walnut Mountain
Wolfpit Mountain

Broken Hills
Wildcat Mountain – Elevation   
Rappahanock Mountain 
Pignut Mountain 
Prickly Pear Mountain 
Viewtree Mountain 
Swains Mountain 
Thumb Run Mountain 
Waters Mountain 
Piney Mountain

Bull Run Mountains
Signal Mountain
High Acre Ridge
High Point Mountain
Bisquit Mountain
Pound Mountain

Catoctin Mountain
Furnace Mountain
Bald Mountain
Carter Ridge
Hogback Mountain
Steptoe Hill

Massanutten Mountain
Massanutten Mountain 
Green Mountain 
Three Top Mountain
Powell Mountain 
Little Crease Mountain
Short Mountain
Mertins Rock
Bowman Mountain
Kerns Mountain
Catback Mountain
Waterfall Mountain
First Mountain
Second Mountain
Third Mountain
Fourth Mountain

Piedmont Monadnocks
Cedar Mountain
Thoroughfare Mountain
Mount Pony
Piney Mountain
Willis Mountain
Spears-Pruett's Mountains
Long Mountain
Johnson Mountain
Smith Mountain
White Oak Mountain

See also
List of mountains of the Appalachians
List of mountains of the United States
List of gaps of Virginia

Mountains
Virginia